The Pauper Party of Ontario is a libertarian-populist political party in the Canadian province of Ontario based on the principles of social credit. Registered in 2011, the party is led by perennial candidate John Turmel.

History
Turmel founded the party in 2011, opting to run in Ontario's provincial election that year under the slogan "we want no cops in gambling, sex or drugs or rock and roll, we want no usury on loans, pay cash or time, no dole". During the campaign, Turmel characterized the policies of the party as "social credit libertarian". Turmel's economic policies focused on what he called the "Argentine solution", based on the policies of the de la Rúa administration in Argentina, which involved the issuing of government bonds to civil employees.

In the 2011 election, Turmel stood in the constituency of Brant while another party candidate, Michael Spottiswood received 54 votes in London North Centre.

Following the 2011 vote, Turmel stood in by-elections in Kitchener–Waterloo, in 2012, Ottawa South in 2013, and Thornhill in 2014.

In the 2014 provincial election, Turmel again stood in Brant, receiving 60 votes. Spottiswood again sought election in London North Centre, and received 70 votes. Another party candidate, Michael Faux, received 52 votes in the riding of Peterborough.

Following the 2014 election, Turmel again stood in three provincial by-elections, including contests in Simcoe North and Sudbury in 2015, and Ottawa-Vanier in 2016.

In both the Simcoe North and Ottawa-Vanier by-elections, Turmel was removed from all-candidates debates by local authorities after seizing the podium and disrupting proceedings.

The party's platform is to legalize gambling, legalize marijuana and institute monetary reform and bartering in the form of the Local Exchange Trading System.

The party failed to win any seats in the 2022 Ontario general election.

Election results

References

External links
 

Provincial political parties in Ontario
Ontario
Libertarian parties
2011 establishments in Ontario
Political parties established in 2011